The 29th People's Choice Awards, honoring the best in popular culture for 2002, were held on January 12, 2003, at the Shrine Auditorium in Los Angeles, California. They were hosted by Tony Danza, and broadcast on CBS.

Awards
Winners are listed first, in bold.

References

External links
2003 People's Choice.com

People's Choice Awards
2002 awards in the United States
2003 in Los Angeles
January 2003 events in the United States